Immigration detention centers and prisons

The Holot detention center or Holot prison was a facility of the Israel Prison Service intended for the detention of illegal immigrants from Eritrea and Sudan who had been living in Israel after having entered through the Israel-Egypt border prior to the building of the Egypt–Israel barrier in 2013. The facility was opened on December 12, 2013, about two kilometers from the Israel–Egypt border, near Ktzi'ot Prison and Saharonim Prison. As countries are prohibited under international law from expelling asylum seekers who have already reached another nation, Israel designed Holot as a detention center for refugees as a way to coerce them into requesting to be deported away from Israel.

The facility included three wings, each of which for 1,120 inmates, and an administrative wing.

In September 2014, the Supreme Court of Israel declared that the facility should be closed, on the ground that Holot infringed on the human right of "human dignity": “infiltrators do not lose one ounce of their right to human dignity just because they reached the country in this way or another.”

After almost four years, on March 14, 2018, the facility was finally closed.

References